Forth 2 is an independent local radio station owned and operated by Bauer Radio as part of the Greatest Hits Radio network.

Forth 2 broadcasts to Edinburgh, The Lothians and Fife on 1548 kHz and DAB 12D, and forms part of Bauer's Greatest Hits Radio network of AM stations in Scotland and Northern England, carrying networked programming 24 hours a day alongside local news and information.

As of December 2022, the station has a weekly audience of 74,000 listeners according to RAJAR.

The station is due to be rebranded to Greatest Hits Radio Edinburgh, the Lothians, Fife and Falkirk on 3 April 2023.

History

Radio Forth was launched on 22 January 1975 by its then managing director the late Richard Findlay. His opening speech included "This, for the very first time is Radio Forth". Steve Hamilton was the first on-air presenter, hosting the breakfast show.

In 1990, Forth was forced to create a new station on its AM frequency. Before this, Radio Forth was broadcast as a single station on both FM and AM frequencies. The FM station was renamed Radio Forth RFM, with Donny Hughes broadcasting the first Breakfast Show from the newly revamped Studio F in Forth House. The station became known as Forth FM in 1993. The new AM station became "Max AM" which was later renamed Forth AM to match its sister station.

In 2000, both stations were relaunched as 97.3 Forth One and 1548 FORTH2. Many changes occurred at this time including new presenters and a new jingles package. Forth 2 was redesigned as an adult contemporary music station while Forth One continued to play Top 40 songs for the 35s and under.

Radio Forth was owned by Scottish Radio Holdings until 23 June 2005 when British media group EMAP took over. In January 2008, EMAP Radio was sold to Bauer. The radio division was renamed Bauer Radio.

A new programming schedule was introduced on Monday 15 June 2009, consisting mostly of programming simulcast with Bauer's other AM stations in Scotland – Clyde 2 from Glasgow, Northsound 2 from Aberdeen, Tay 2 from Dundee and West Sound AM from Ayr. Forth 2 local programming was then restricted to breakfast shows, news bulletins and some specialist programming although the station also produced networked output on weekday evenings and Sunday mornings.

On 3 June 2013, station owners Bauer Radio announced Forth 2 would axe its remaining local programming with the weekday breakfast show, presented by Bob Malcolm, replaced with a networked show hosted by Robin Galloway from Monday 1 July 2013 across Bauer's network of AM stations in Scotland. The station became part of the Bauer City 2 network on Monday 5 January 2015.

On 17 June 2022, Forth 2 along with sister station Forth 1, moved into new studios in St James Quarter, Edinburgh, after leaving their long term home in Forth House.

Programming
Most of Forth 2's programming is carried from Greatest Hits Radio's network of locally branded Scottish stations with some off-peak output also carried from GHR's sister network in England. Forth 2 produces weekend shows for the whole network, The Saturday evening show Boogie Nights presented by Andy Bouglas and a Sunday evening show presented by Arlene Stuart, Both shows are broadcast from its Edinburgh studios. Occasionally, the weekday breakfast show Ewen & Cat @ Breakfast (formerly Ewen Cameron in the Morning) will come from the Edinburgh studios to tie in with the Edinburgh Festival.

Networked programming originates from the studios of Clyde 2 in Clydebank and Tay 2 in Dundee and from Greatest Hits Radio's Birmingham, Nottingham, London and Manchester studios. Occasional programming is produced and broadcast from MFR 2 in Inverness, Northsound 2 in Aberdeen and West Sound in Ayrshire and Dumfries and Galloway.

News
Forth 2 broadcasts local news bulletins hourly from 6am to 7pm on weekdays and from 7am to 1pm at weekends. Headlines are broadcast on the half hour during weekday breakfast and drivetime shows, alongside sport and traffic bulletins.

National bulletins from Sky News Radio are carried overnight with bespoke networked Scottish bulletins at weekends, produced from Radio Clyde's newsroom in Clydebank.

See also
Radio Forth
Forth 1

References

External links
 

Greatest Hits Radio
Radio stations established in 1975
Radio stations in Edinburgh